Tezoatlán de Segura y Luna is a town and municipality in Oaxaca in south-western Mexico. It is part of the Huajuapan District in the north of the Mixteca Region.

Demographics
Tezoatlán de Segura y Luna has a population of 11,319 inhabitants according to data from the INEGI Population and Housing Census of 2010. Of these, 5,158 are men and 6,161 are women.

Towns
The municipality of Tezoatlán de Segura y Luna is made up of several small towns and villages including:

Bario de Perú
Bario Independencia
Caguani
Cuesta Blanca
El Aguacate
El Paredón Amarillo
Guadalupe de Cisneros
Juquila de León
La Lomita
Las Peñas
Linda Vista del Progreso
Miraplayas
Rancho Juárez
Rancho Reforma
Rancho Señor
Rosario Nuevo
San Andrés Yutatío
San Isidro el Naranjo
San Isidro Zaragoza
San Juan Cuititó
San Juan Diquiyú
San Marcos de Garzón
San Martín del Río
San Valentín de Gomez
San Vicente del Palmar
Santa Catarina Yutandú
Santa Cruz Numá
Santa María Tindú
Tezoatlán de Segura y Luna
Yucuñuti de Benito Juárez
Yucuquimi de Ocampo

References

Municipalities of Oaxaca